An open file format is a file format for storing digital data, defined by an openly published specification usually maintained by a standards organization, and which can be used and implemented by anyone. Open file format is licensed with open license. For example, an open format can be implemented by both proprietary and free and open-source software, using the typical software licenses used by each. In contrast to open file formats, closed file formats are considered trade secrets. However, the actual image used by an open file format may still be copyrighted or trademarked.

Depending on the definition, the specification of an open format may require a fee to access or, very rarely, contain other restrictions. The range of meanings is similar to that of the term open standard.

Specific definitions

Sun Microsystems
Sun Microsystems defined the criteria for open formats as follows:
 The format is based on an underlying open standard
 The format is developed through a publicly visible, community driven process
 The format is affirmed and maintained by a vendor-independent standards organization
 The format is fully documented and publicly available
 The format does not contain proprietary extensions

UK government
In 2012 the UK Government created the policy Open Standards Principles, stating that the Open Standards Principles apply to every aspect of government IT and that Government technology must remain open to everyone. They have seven principles for selecting open standards for use in government, following these principals many open formats were adopted, notably Open Document Format (ODF). The seven principles for selecting open standards for use in the UK government are:

 Open standards must meet user needs
 Open standards must give suppliers equal access to government contracts
 Open standards must support flexibility and change
 Open standards must support sustainable cost
 Select open standards using well-informed decisions
 Select open standards using fair and transparent processes
 Specify and implement open standards using fair and transparent processes

US government
Within the framework of Open Government Initiative, the federal government of the United States adopted the Open Government Directive, according to which: "An open format is one that is platform independent, machine readable, and made available to the public without restrictions that would impede the re-use of that information".

State of Minnesota
The State of Minnesota defines the criteria for open, XML-based file formats as follows:

 The format is interoperable among diverse internal and external platforms and applications
 The format is fully published and available royalty-free
 The format is implemented by multiple vendors
 The format is controlled by an open industry organization with a well-defined inclusive process for evolution of the standard

Commonwealth of Massachusetts
The Commonwealth of Massachusetts "defines open formats as specifications for data file formats that are based on an underlying open standard, developed by an open community, affirmed and maintained by a standards body and are fully documented and publicly available."

The Enterprise Technical Reference Model (ETRM) classifies four formats as "Open Formats":
OASIS Open Document Format For Office Applications (OpenDocument) v. 1.1
Ecma-376 Office Open XML Formats (Open XML)
Hypertext Document Format v. 4.01
Plain Text Format

The Linux Information Project
According to The Linux Information Project, the term open format should refer to "any format that is published for anyone to read and study but which may or may not be encumbered by patents, copyrights or other restrictions on use" – as opposed to a free format which is not encumbered by any copyrights, patents, trademarks or other restrictions.

Examples of open formats

Open formats (in the royalty-free and free access sense) include:
 PNG — a raster image format standardized by ISO/IEC
 FLAC — lossless audio codec
 WebM — a video/audio container format
 HTML — is the main markup language for creating web pages and other information that can be displayed in a web browser.
 gzip — for compression
 CSS — style sheet format usually used with (X)HTML, standardized by W3C

The following formats are open (royalty-free with a one-time fee on the standard):
 PDF: old versions are free in both senses, but since PDF 1.8 the standards require a fee;
 Office Open XML: the ECMA version is free to access, but the newer ISO versions require a fee;
 OpenDocument: As adopted by the UK Government in 2012 to meet their open standards principles, for Government technology to remain open to everyone.
 C language: royalty-free, but ISO standard requires a fee (drafts available for free);

See also

 Open standard
 Open source
 Openness
 Embrace, extend, and extinguish
 List of open-source codecs
 Open educational resources
 Open system
 Free content
 Network effect
 Proprietary file format
 Vendor lock-in

References

External links

OpenFormats
Practical Advice for using Free Formats from Ubuntu Community Documentation
Study on the: Economic impact of open source software on innovation and the competitiveness of the Information and Communication Technologies (ICT) sector in the EU, 2006 EU report in favor of adopting open source software
 Free File Format Definition
 Definition of Free Cultural Works

Computer file formats